Pizzo Campolungo is a mountain of the Lepontine Alps, overlooking Prato and Dalpe in the Leventina valley of the canton of Ticino. It lies just south of the Campolungo Pass.

References

External links
 Pizzo Campolungo on Hikr

Mountains of the Alps
Mountains of Switzerland
Mountains of Ticino
Lepontine Alps